Elthusa is a genus of isopods in the family Cymothoidae, with more than 30 described species.

Species
These 32 species belong to the genus Elthusa:

 Elthusa alvaradoensis Rocha-Ramírez, Chávez-López & Bruce, 2005
 Elthusa arnoglossi Trilles & Justine, 2006
 Elthusa atlantniroi (Kononenko, 1988A)
 Elthusa californica (Schioedte & Meinert, 1884)
 Elthusa caudata (Schioedte & Meinert, 1884)
 Elthusa emarginata (Bleeker, 1857)
 Elthusa epinepheli Trilles & Justine, 2010
 Elthusa foveolata (Hansen, 1897)
 Elthusa frontalis (Richardson, 1910A)
 Elthusa menziesi (R. C. Brusca, 1981)
 Elthusa methepia (Schioedte & Meinert, 1884)
 Elthusa moritakii Nobuhiro Saito & Takeo Yamauchi, 2016
 Elthusa myripristae Bruce, 1990
 Elthusa nanoides (Stebbing, 1905)
 Elthusa neocytta (Avdeev, 1975)
 Elthusa nierstraszi Hadfield, Bruce & Smit, 2016
 Elthusa ochotensis (Kussakin, 1979)
 Elthusa parabothi Trilles & Justine, 2004
 Elthusa parva (Nierstrasz, 1915)
 Elthusa philippinensis (Richardson, 1910A
 Elthusa propinqua (Richardson, 1904A)
 Elthusa raynaudii (H. Milne-Edwards, 1840)
 Elthusa sacciger (Richardson, 1909A)
 Elthusa samariscii (Shiino, 1951A)
 Elthusa samoensis (Schioedte & Meinert, 1884)
 Elthusa sigani Bruce, 1990
 Elthusa sinuata (Koelbel, 1879)
 Elthusa splendida (Sadowsky & Moreira, 1981)
 Elthusa tropicalis (Menzies & Kruczynski, 1983)
 Elthusa turgidula (Hale, 1926)
 Elthusa vulgaris (Stimpson, 1857)
 Elthusa winstoni Hadfield, Tuttle & Smit, 2017

References

Further reading

 

Cymothoida
Articles created by Qbugbot